LaMonica Garrett (born May 23, 1975) is an American actor and former professional Slamball player. He is best known for Deputy Sheriff Cane in Sons of Anarchy (2011–2014), Mike Ritter in Designated Survivor (2016–2018), John in Primal (2019), Mar Novu / Monitor and Anti-Monitor in the Arrowverse (2018–2020), and Thomas in 1883 (2021–2022).

Early years and sports career
LaMonica Garrett was born in San Francisco, California. He was named after former Oakland Raiders quarterback Daryle Lamonica, of whom his parents were fans. During high school, Garrett was a football player. When his family moved to Los Angeles, he and a friend were transferred to Burbank High School. Garrett has said that although his friend made the varsity team, he was held back on the junior varsity team due to his ego and attitude. In an interview with Muscle and Fitness magazine, he refers to this setback as a "wake-up call, which taught him both humility and accountability—and drove him into the gym."

Because of this, Garrett started working out more intensively and managed to excel on offense. After high school, he attended a Los Angeles junior college where he played as a linebacker. Eventually, Garrett transferred to Central State University in Ohio where he continued to play. At one point, he led the team in tackles. Garrett considered joining the NFL, but despite having what he called "a great Pro Day" and having some workouts with the Detroit Lions and the Los Angeles Rams, he was not picked up.

Garrett had always been interested in acting, so he moved to Los Angeles to pursue a career in entertainment. In the meantime, he worked as a FedEx driver to pay for acting classes. Garrett also started playing Slamball, a hybrid between basketball and football played with trampolines. During his time playing, he became the league's leading scorer and one of four players announced for the All Slamball Team.

Acting career
While still a Slamball player, Garrett landed a role on an episode of One Tree Hill that had a Slamball-related storyline. After that, he signed with an agent and continued to get minor roles in TV shows like Hawthorne, CSI: Miami, and NCIS, as well as films like Transformers: Dark of the Moon. In 2011, Garrett started a recurring role as Deputy Sheriff Cane on FX's Sons of Anarchy. He appeared in 17 episodes from 2011 to 2014.

In 2016, Garrett landed two key roles; the first one, as Lieutenant TAO Cameron Burk on TNT's The Last Ship, and the second as Secret Service agent Mike Ritter on ABC's Designated Survivor. David Guggenheim, creator and executive producer of the latter, said they "needed someone who could throw President Tom Kirkman into a car", but that had "an emotional core goodness". The character of Mike Ritter became a fan favorite and Garrett remained with the show through the whole first two seasons, until its initial cancelation. After the show was picked up by Netflix, Garrett confirmed on Twitter that after "lengthy negotiations" he would not return due to budget constraints.

In late 2018, he was cast as Mar Novu / The Monitor in the Arrowverse crossover event "Elseworlds" on The CW, which connects storylines from The Flash, Arrow, and Supergirl. He reprised the role throughout the spring 2019 episodes of Arrow, The Flash, Supergirl, and Legends of Tomorrow. He was later upgraded to a series regular for those shows, as well as Batwoman, to ensure his availability for all appearances prior to and in the "Crisis on Infinite Earths" crossover. In July 2019, it was announced that Garrett would also be portraying the Anti-Monitor in the crossover.

In 2021, Garrett was cast as Thomas in 1883, a Yellowstone Origin Story, which is available exclusively on Paramount+. This show debuted December 19, 2021, and is a spin-off of the popular Paramount Network show Yellowstone, starring Kevin Costner. 1883 stars Faith Hill, Sam Elliott, and Tim McGraw.

Selected filmography

Film

Television

Video games

References

External links
Garrett on IMDB

1975 births
21st-century American male actors
African-American male actors
American male film actors
American male television actors
American male video game actors
Living people
Male actors from San Francisco
21st-century African-American people
20th-century African-American people